Roubidoux Creek is a tributary to the Gasconade River in the Ozarks of south central Missouri named after French-Canadian fur trader Joseph Robidoux. Due to its colder water temperatures, it is listed as a trout stream. Roubidoux Spring is a landmark that is nestled just south of downtown Waynesville. The creek cuts north through Fort Leonard Wood before crossing underneath Interstate 44 and into the city limits of Waynesville.

The Roubidoux joins the Gasconade River just north of Waynesville, and the confluence can be seen from Missouri Route 17. The mouth of the creek is located at coordinates .

See also
List of rivers of Missouri

References

Rivers of Missouri
Rivers of Pulaski County, Missouri
Rivers of Texas County, Missouri
Tributaries of the Gasconade River